Japalura is a genus of lizards in the family Agamidae. Species of Japalura are native to Pakistan, India, China, and Myanmar. Many species have been moved to the genus Diploderma.

Species
The following eight species are recognized as being valid:

Nota bene: a binomial authority in parentheses indicates that the species was originally described in a genus other than Japalura.

References

Further reading
Gray JE (1853). "Descriptions of some undescribed species of Reptiles collected by Dr. Joseph Hooker in the Khassia Mountains, East Bengal, and Sikkim Himalaya". Annals and Magazine of Natural History, Second Series 12: 386-392. (Japalura, new genus, pp. 387–388).

Japalura
Lizard genera
Taxa named by John Edward Gray